Arcteranthis is a genus of flowering plants belonging to the family Ranunculaceae. It contains a single species, Arcteranthis cooleyae. Its native range is Washington, British Columbia and Alaska.

References

Ranunculaceae
Ranunculaceae genera
Monotypic Ranunculales genera